Major General Frederick Henry Osborn CBE (21 March 1889 – 5 January 1981) was an American philanthropist, military leader, and eugenicist. He was a founder of several organizations and played a central part in reorienting eugenics in the years following World War II away from the race- and class-consciousness of earlier periods. The American Philosophical Society considers him to have been "the respectable face of eugenic research in the post-war period."

World War I and the founding of organizations
Osborn graduated from Princeton University in 1910 and attended Trinity College, Cambridge, for a postgraduate year. His family had made their fortune in the railroad business, and he went into the family business up until the outbreak of World War I, when he served in the American Red Cross in France as Commander of the Advance Zone for the last 11 months of the war. In 1928, he became a research associate at the American Museum of Natural History studying anthropology and population.

He was one of the founding members of the American Eugenics Society in 1926 and joined the British Eugenics Society in 1928, serving as its Secretary in 1931. Osborn was also instrumental in the founding of the Population Association of America in 1931. He played a central role in the 1936 founding of the Office of Population Research at Princeton University, a leading demographic research and training center. Osborn was one of the founding trustees of the Pioneer Fund in 1937, a charitable foundation charged with promoting eugenics.  Also in 1937, Osborn praised the Nazi eugenics programs as the "most important experiment which has ever been tried."

According to J. Phillipe Rushton, Osborn was the first to point out that although African Americans scored lower than whites on the Army intelligence tests, those from five urban northern states scored slightly higher than whites from eight rural southern states did, demonstrating the influence of cultural factors on IQ scores.

In the following decades, Osborn remained skeptical of the hereditarian hypothesis of the variance in IQ scores found between racial groups. He suspected that environment played a greater role than genetics in the shaping of human beings, and thought eugenics should take place within groups (well-adapted families should be given the means to have more children) rather than between them (inferior races should be replaced).

An admirer of the reforms instituted in 1930s Sweden through the efforts of economist Gunnar Myrdal and his wife Alva Myrdal, Osborn emphasized the eugenic potential of extended state support in childcare, recreation, housing, nursery services, and education as a means of stimulating fertility among desirable populations. He argued that the aim of eugenics should be to ensure that every child was wanted. Osborn believed that in this system, which he called the "true freedom of parenthood," the parents most capable of rearing children would be likelier to have more.

World War II and later life
Many civil rights leaders alleged that, even after the revelation of genocide in World War II, eugenic influences remained strong in the United States because of Osborn and others of the Population Society (including John D. Rockefeller, Lewis Strauss, Karl Compton, and Detlev Bronk). He also encouraged and endorsed programs in Nazi Germany that sterilized Jews, Poles, and others deemed "unsuitable" to breed. Although Hitler's genocidal tactics and acts caused revulsion in the United States, he continued to promote eugenic ideals.

In 1940, Osborn was selected by Franklin Roosevelt to chair the Civilian Advisory Committee on Selective Service. Five months later, he took over as Chair of the Army Committee on Welfare and Recreation, responsible for information and education services for military personnel. In September 1941, he was commissioned as Brigadier General and appointed Chief of the Morale Branch of the War Department (later called the Information and Education Division of Special Services). By the war's end, he had earned promotion to Major General and had been awarded a Bronze Star in Paris, the Distinguished Service Medal, and the Selective Service Medal, and he was made Honorary Commander in the Most Excellent Order of the British Empire.

Osborn served at Princeton, as a charter trustee from 1943 to 1955, and as a member of several advisory boards, including the Curriculum Committee and Psychology Department Council.

During the postwar years, one of Osborn's lasting influences was shifting the emphasis of American eugenics to positive eugenics, which seeks to achieve eugenic goals through encouraging the spread of desired traits, as opposed to negative eugenics, which seeks to achieve eugenic goals through discouraging the spread of undesired traits.

Osborn was elected to the American Philosophical Society in 1948.

In 1954, Osborn played a central role in the founding of the journal Eugenics Quarterly, published by Duke University, which changed its name in 1968 to Social Biology.  Osborn explained the name change, writing: "The name was changed because it became evident that changes of a eugenic nature would be made for reasons other than eugenics, and that tying a eugenic label on them would more often hinder than help their adoption. Birth control and abortion are turning out to be great eugenic advances of our time. If they had been advanced for eugenic reasons it would have retarded or stopped their acceptance.”

In 1968 Osborn published The Future of Human Heredity: An Introduction to Eugenics in Modern Society, in which he complained that Hitler had "prostituted eugenics" but that the original goals of raising the average intelligence and character of future generations could be by programs advocating population control directed at convincing women of less intelligence, especially among the poor, to reduce their births voluntarily in order to "further the social and biological improvement of the population."  In summary, he noted: "Eugenic goals are most likely to be attained under a name other than eugenics."

References 
 
Osborn FH. "History of the American Eugenics Society," Social Biology, vol. 21 no. 2 Summer 1974, 115-126
Saxon, W. "Frederick Osborn, a general, 91, dies; Headed Army Information Unit and Held U.N. Post--Was Leader in Studies on Population Served on U.N. Commissions." New York Times Jan 7, 1981. p. B12.
"The History of the Journal Social Biology, 1954-1999," Social Biology, Fall-Winter 1999, Vol. 46, Num. 3-4.
"Frederick Henry Osborn Papers," American Philosophical Society (APS), 1983, published online.
Edmund Ramsden, "Social Demography and Eugenics in the Interwar United States" Population and Development Review, Vol. 29, No. 4. (Dec., 2003), pp. 547–593.

External links 
Frederick H. Osborn Papers via American Philosophical Society
Frederick H. Osborn quotes and excerpts
"Study of Education at Princeton and the 1954 Advisee Project", assisted by Osborn, sought to "replace grand assumptions about university education with quantifiable facts and could potentially 'bring into view an entirely new horizon of educational accomplishment.'"
Frederick H. Osborn Papers, 1941–1963, "correspondence and reports related to Osborn's service at Princeton." (papers not available online)
Social Biology: Biannual Journal of the Study of Social Biology, Duke University.

1889 births
1981 deaths
American eugenicists
Princeton University alumni
United States Army personnel of World War II
Recipients of the Distinguished Service Medal (US Army)
United States Army generals
American Red Cross personnel
Presidents of the Population Council
Dodge family
Members of the American Philosophical Society